John Florian Sowa (born 1940) is an American computer scientist, an expert in artificial intelligence and computer design, and the inventor of conceptual graphs.<ref>Kecheng Liu (2000) Semiotics in Information Systems Engineering. p.54 states: Conceptual graphs are devised as a language of knowledge representation by Sowa (1984), based on philosophy, psychology and linguistics. Knowledge in conceptual graph form is highly structured by modelling specialised facts that can be subjected to generalised reasoning.</ref>

 Biography 
Sowa received a BS in mathematics from Massachusetts Institute of Technology in 1962, an MA in applied mathematics from Harvard University in 1966, and a PhD in computer science from the Vrije Universiteit Brussel in 1999 on a dissertation titled "Knowledge Representation: Logical, Philosophical, and Computational Foundations".

Sowa spent most of his professional career at IBM, which started in 1962 at IBM's applied mathematics group. Over the decades he has researched and developed emerging fields of computer science from compilers, programming languages, and system architecture to artificial intelligence and knowledge representation. In the 1990s Sowa was associated with IBM Educational Center in New York. Over the years he taught courses at the IBM Systems Research Institute, Binghamton University, Stanford University, the Linguistic Society of America and the Université du Québec à Montréal. He is a fellow of the Association for the Advancement of Artificial Intelligence.

After early retirement at IBM Sowa in 2001 cofounded VivoMind Intelligence, Inc. with Arun K. Majumdar. With this company he was developing data-mining and database technology, more specific high-level "ontologies" for artificial intelligence and automated natural language understanding. Currently Sowa is working with Kyndi Inc., also founded by Majumdar.

John Sowa is married to the philologist Cora Angier Sowa, and they live in Croton-on-Hudson, New York.

 Work 
Sowa's research interest since the 1970s were in the field of artificial intelligence, expert systems and database query linked to natural languages. In his work he combines ideas from numerous disciplines and eras modern and ancient, for example, applying ideas from Aristotle, the medieval Scholastics to Alfred North Whitehead and including database schema theory, and incorporating the model of analogy of Islamic scholar Ibn Taymiyyah in his works.

 Conceptual graph 

Sowa invented conceptual graphs, a graphic notation for logic and natural language, based on the structures in semantic networks and on the existential graphs of Charles S. Peirce. He published the concept in the 1976 article "Conceptual graphs for a data base interface" in the IBM Journal of Research and Development. He further explained in the 1983 book Conceptual structures: information processing in mind and machine.

In the 1980s, this theory had "been adopted by a number of research and development groups throughout the world. International conferences on conceptual structures (ICCS) have been held since 1993, following a series of conceptual graph workshops that began in 1986.

Sowa's law of standards
In 1991, Sowa first stated his Law of Standards: 
 "Whenever a major organization develops a new system as an official standard for X, the primary result is the widespread adoption of some simpler system as a de facto standard for X." 
Like Gall's law, The Law of Standards is essentially an argument in favour of underspecification. Examples include:

The introduction of PL/I resulting in COBOL and FORTRAN becoming the de facto standards for business and scientific programming respectively
The introduction of Algol-68 resulting in Pascal becoming the de facto standard for academic programming
The introduction of the Ada language resulting in C becoming the de facto standard for DoD programming
The introduction of OS/2 resulting in Windows becoming the de facto standard for desktop OS
The introduction of X.400 resulting in SMTP becoming the de facto standard for electronic mail
The introduction of X.500 resulting in LDAP becoming the de facto standard for directory services

 Publications 
 1984. Conceptual Structures - Information Processing in Mind and Machine. The Systems Programming Series, Addison-Wesley
 1991. Principles of Semantic Networks. Morgan Kaufmann.
 
 1994. International Conference on Conceptual Structures (2nd : 1994 : College Park, Md.)	Conceptual structures, current practices : Second International Conference on Conceptual Structures, ICCS'94, College Park, Maryland, USA, August 16–20, 1994 : proceedings. William M. Tepfenhart, Judith P. Dick, John F. Sowa, eds.

 2000. Knowledge representation : logical, philosophical, and computational foundations, Brooks Cole Publishing Co., Pacific Grove

Articles, a selection

 1992. "Conceptual Graph Summary"; In: T.E. Nagle et al. (Eds.). Conceptual Structures: Current Research and Practice. Chichester: Ellis Horwood. 
 1995. "Top-level ontological categories." in: International journal of human-computer studies. Vol. 43, Iss. 5–6, Nov. 1995, pp. 669–685
 2006. "Semantic Networks". In: Encyclopedia of Cognitive Science.''. John Wiley & Sons.

In popular culture 
John Sowa is claimed to be a protagonist of the fantasy novel Great Works: A tale of logic and magic. The epic of John Sowa, but according to a comment that book is not related to him.

References

External links 

 John F. Sowa homepage

1940 births
Artificial intelligence researchers
Knowledge representation
Living people
People from Croton-on-Hudson, New York
Harvard School of Engineering and Applied Sciences alumni
Binghamton University faculty
Massachusetts Institute of Technology School of Science alumni
Vrije Universiteit Brussel alumni